The Ministry of the Army was a government department of Spain that was tasked with oversight of the Spanish Army (Ejército de Tierra) during the Francoist regime.

The ministry was created on 8 August 1939, after the end of the Spanish Civil War. It was dissolved on 4 July 1977 by the Royal Decree 1558/77, being merged with the Ministry of Defence as part of the transition to democracy.

History 
The three branches of the Armed Forces (Army, Navy and Air Force) were grouped under its control. It was disestablished on 8 August 1939, after the end of the Civil War, when the ministries of Army, Navy and Air were created in the second government of Francisco Franco. On 22 September the organic structure of the new ministerial department was organized.

Over the years, the Ministry became a bureaucratic giant, practically closed to society and the country that were progressively evolving. The Ministry became a slow organism, without even a standardized and unified administrative criterion due to the internal contradictions of its different departments and the multiple competencies that each of them had. The administrative inefficiency reached the point that sometimes the departments of the Ministry encountered problems in coordinating the Military Regions of Spain with each other. Thus, the Ministry became the exponent of a bureaucratic office where it was possible to obtain a position or administrative charges depending on the services provided to the regime, or to the rampant nepotism that prevailed within the Army.

The Ministry was abolished by the Royal Decree 1558/77 of 4 July 1977, when Prime Minister Adolfo Suárez created the Ministry of Defence as part of his second government (formed following the 1977 general election), which integrated the ministries of the Army, Navy and Air Force during the transition to democracy.

Organic structure 
On 22 September 1939 the structure of the Ministry was organized, being composed of the following departments:

 General Staff of the Army
 General Secretariat
 General Directorates: Military Education, Recruitment and Personnel, Industry and Material, Transportation
 General Inspection of Fortifications
 Directorate-General of the Civil Guard and Carabineros
 Superior Council of the Army
 

The powers of this tribunal were not limited only to the Army, but also the Navy and the Air Force. In addition, it implied the full restoration of the Code of Military Justice of 1890.

In the case of the Civil Guard, it was subject to the Ministry of the Army "in everything related to its organization, discipline, armament and personnel", but also depended in other areas of the Ministry of the Interior and Ministry of Finance. The Carabineros were integrated into the Civil Guard in 1940 and disappeared, while the new Armed Police Corps, created in 1941, was also subject to the Army in some areas.

List of ministers

Notes

See also 
 Chief of Staff of the Army (Spain)

References

Bibliography 
 
 
 

Defunct departments of the Spanish Government
Ministries established in 1939
Ministries disestablished in 1977
1939 establishments in Spain
1977 disestablishments in Spain